The SNCASE SE.161 Languedoc was a French four-engined airliner produced by SNCASE (Sud-Est). Developed from the Bloch MB.160 and known in the late 1930s as the (SNCSO) Bloch MB.161, the SE.161 was in service with Air France and the French military after World War II.

Design and development
In 1936, Air Afrique needed a new airliner for its African services. Marcel Bloch proposed a development of his Bloch MB.160 aircraft, the Bloch MB.161, which after World War II became the SNCASE SE.161 Languedoc. Design work on the new aircraft began in 1937.
The prototype, F-ARTV, first flew on 15 December 1939. It was powered by four Gnome-Rhône 14N radial engines of  each. The aircraft underwent a slow development programme and the test flying was not completed until January 1942. The French Vichy government placed an order for twenty in December 1941, but none were built.

After the liberation of France the provisional government led by General De Gaulle authorised production to be resumed with the first series production aircraft, designated the SE.161 and registered F-BATA, first flying either on 25 August 1945 or 17 September 1945. An initial batch of 40 production examples was completed for Air France between October 1945 and April 1948.

The Languedoc was an all-metal four-engined low wing cantilever monoplane airliner with twin fins and rudders. It had a crew of five (pilot, co-pilot/navigator, radio operator, flight engineer and steward)  Standard cabin accommodation was for 33 passengers seated in eleven rows of three, two on the starboard side and one to port. An alternative first class arrangement was for 24 seats. A 44-seat higher density version was introduced by Air France in 1951.

The Languedoc was fitted with underwing retractable main undercarriage wheels and a tailwheel landing gear and was powered by four  Gnome-Rhône 14N 44/45 or 54/55 radial engines in wing-leading edge nacelles, with partial convertibility to inline water-cooled pistons.

A total of 100 aircraft were built for Air France, the French Air Force and French Navy. Several examples were utilised as test aircraft with the CEV at Villacoublay and elsewhere. The only export customer for new production aircraft was the Polish airline LOT which bought five with some being refitted with Pratt & Whitney R-1830 Twin Wasp radial engines.

Operational history
The SE.161 was named the Languedoc before it entered service with Air France on the Paris to Algiers route from 28 May 1946. By October they were withdrawn from service with a number of faults, including landing gear problems, poor view from the cockpit when landing in bad weather and a lack of de-icing equipment and cabin heating. The Gnome Rhône engines also had a very short time between overhauls. They re-entered service in 1947, re-engined with the reliable American-built Pratt & Whitney R-1830 engines; also de-icing equipment, medium-range cockpit radios, and limited cabin heating, the designation changing to SE.161.P7. These enhancements partially reassured commercial airline customers. The Languedoc was soon a familiar type on Air France's increasing European network and continued to operate scheduled services to London Heathrow, Berlin Tempelhof, Paris Le Bourget and Brussels Melsbroek until summer 1952, when they were steadily replaced by the reliable and popular Douglas DC-4.

Despite the costly experience of introducing the Languedoc to service, they were never as reliable as the Douglas DC-4 or the ultra-modern turboprop Vickers Viscount, such that many French passengers refused to fly on the unreliable, unheated and noisy aircraft. Air France ultimately sold some of its Languedocs to Air Liban of Lebanon, Misrair of Egypt and Aviaco of Spain.  Others were transferred to the French military.

Ten ex-Air France aircraft were converted for operation in the Search and Rescue (SAR) role with SGACC. They were modified with a large ventral gondola, observation windows and a ventral search radar under a transparent fairing, similar to the design adopted in the French Navy SAR Avro Lancasters.

The largest military operator was the French Navy, which operated 25 different Languedoc aircraft over the years. The first aircraft were delivered in 1949 and used as long-range transports between Paris, Marseille and Lyon, and North Africa; later aircraft would be used as flying classrooms for non-pilot aircrew training. The flying classrooms were modified with both a nose radar set and a ventral "dustbin" radar. The aircraft was withdrawn from Naval service in 1959.

A small number of Languedocs were used as flying testbeds and mother ships, succeeding the pair of He 274 prototype airframes left behind by the Luftwaffe in 1944 that were partly being used as "mother ships" for high-speed French aerodynamic research aircraft, with four Languedocs being used as mother ships for René Leduc's experimental ramjet aircraft in place of the hard-to-maintain He 274s, themselves scrapped by the French in 1953. Languedocs were also used for other types of experimental work including an unsuccessful use as live airborne television relay for Charles de Gaulles's Algerian visit in 1958.

The last Air France Languedoc was withdrawn from domestic service in 1954, being then unable to compete with more modern airliners.

Accidents and incidents
On 2 April 1943, F-ARTV force-landed and overturned at La Chapelle-Baloue, Creuse with one fatality.
On 7 October 1947, F-BATY of Air France crashed at Bône, Algeria.
On 26 January 1948, F-BCUC  of Air France crashed at Romainville, Seine-Saint-Denis whilst on a training flight, killing all nine people on board.
On 4 February 1948, F-BATK of Air France was damaged beyond economical repair at Marignane Airport, Bouches-du-Rhône.
On 10 February 1948, F-BATH of Air France was damaged beyond economical repair at Orly Airport, Paris. Its fuselage subsequently served for many years as a ground training airframe.
On 14 June 1948, F-BATG of Air France crashed at Coulommiers - Voisins Aerodrome, Seine-et-Marne.
On 29 August 1948, F-BATO of Air France crashed at Le Bourget Airport, Paris.
On 23 November 1948, F-BATM of Air France crashed at Toulouse, Haute-Garonne whilst on a test flight, killing one of the five people on board. The cause of the accident was that the aileron controls had been assembled incorrectly.
On 9 April 1949, F-BATU of Air France overran the runway at Nice Airport, Alpes-Maritimes and was damaged beyond economic repair.
On 30 July 1950, F-BCUI of Air France was damaged beyond economic repair when its undercarriage collapsed on landing at Marignane Airport, Marseille.
On 22 December 1951, SU-AHH of Misrair crashed west of Tehran, Iran killing all 20 people on board. The aircraft was operating an international scheduled passenger flight from Baghdad, Iraq to Tehran.
on 3 March 1952, F-BCUM of Air France crashed shortly after take-off from Nice Airport killing all 38 people on board. The cause of the accident was that the aileron controls had jammed. The aircraft was operating a domestic scheduled passenger flight from Nice to Orly Airport, Paris.
On 7 April 1952, F-BATB of Air France was damaged beyond economic repair when it overran the runway on take-off from Le Bourget Airport, Paris. The aircraft was operating an international scheduled passenger flight from Le Bourget to Heathrow Airport, London.
On 30 July 1952, SU-AHX of Misrair was damaged beyond economic repair in a wheels-up landing at Almaza Air Base, Cairo. The aircraft was operating an international scheduled passenger flight from Almaza to Khartoum Airport, Sudan; it returned to Cairo following a fire in No. 1 engine.
On 23 October 1952, F-RAPC of Aéronavale crashed at Bonneuil-sur-Marne, Val-de-Marne, killing all eleven people on board.
On 6 January 1954, OD-ABU of Air Liban crashed on take-off from Bir Hassan Airport, Beirut and was consequently destroyed by fire. The aircraft was operating a scheduled international passenger flight from Beirut to Kuwait Airport, Kuwait.
On 24 April 1954, SU-AHZ of Misrair was written off at Damascus Airport, Syria when the starboard undercarriage collapsed on landing.
On 29 September 1956, EC-AKV of Aviaco crashed on approach to Los Rodeos Airport, Tenerife killing one person on the ground. The aircraft was operating a domestic scheduled passenger flight from Málaga Airport to Tenerife.
On 4 December 1958, EC-ANR of Aviaco crashed into the La Rodilla de la Mujer Muerta mountain, in the Guadarrama Mountains, killing all 21 people on board. The aircraft was operating a domestic scheduled passenger flight from Vigo Airport to Barajas Airport, Madrid.

Variants
Bloch 161-01
Prototype powered by 2 ×  Gnome-Rhône 14N-38 & 2 × 900 hp Gnome-Rhône 14N-39, first flown on 15 December 1939.
SE.161/1
Production aircraft with 2 ×  Gnome-Rhône 14N-44 & 2 ×  Gnome-Rhône 14N-45 radial engines, LOT aircraft were fitted with 14N-54 / 14N-55 engines and later re-engined with 14N-68 / 14N-69 engines. Aeronavale aircraft were also fitted with 14N-68 / 14N-69s.
SE.161/P7
Re-engined Air France aircraft with four  Pratt & Whitney R-1830 SIC-3-G engines.

Operators

 Misrair

 Vichy French Government
 Air France
 
 French Air Force
EARS 99
GT I/61 "Maine"
 French Navy
Escadron 31S
Escadron 10S
Escadron 54S
Escadron 56S

 Air Liban

 Air Atlas

 LOT Polish Airlines bought five aircraft in 1947 (reg. SP-LDA to LDE). Due to engine failures, the fleet was suspended in 1948 and broken up in 1950.

 Aviaco

 Tunis Air

Specifications (SE.161/1)

See also

Notes

Bibliography
 Bridgman, Leonard. Jane's All The World's Aircraft 1948. London: Sampson Low, Marston & Company, Ltd, 1948.
 Chillon J., J-P Dubois and J.Wegg. French Postwar Transport Aircraft. Tonbridge, Kent, UK: Air-Britain (Historians) Limited. 1980. .

 Munson, Kenneth. Civil Airliners since 1946. London: Blandford Press, 1967.
 The Illustrated Encyclopedia of Aircraft (Part Work 1982-1985). London: Orbis Publishing, 1985.
 
 Stroud, John. European Transport Aircraft since 1910. London: Putnam, 1966.
 Taylor, Michael J. H. Jane's Encyclopedia of Aviation. p. 844 London: Studio Editions, 1989. .

External links

1930s French airliners
Sud-Est aircraft
Languedoc
Low-wing aircraft
Four-engined tractor aircraft
Aircraft first flown in 1939
Four-engined piston aircraft